Charles K. Scott (born August 19, 1945) is a Republican member of the Wyoming Senate, representing the 30th district since 1983. Previously he was in the House from 1979 to 1982. He received an MBA from Harvard Business School.

Scott won reelection in 2016 over Democratic opponent Robert Ford 5,831-1,521 (79.3% - 20.7%). In February 2022, Scott was a strong proponent for a budget amendment to eliminate the University of Wyoming Gender Studies program, stating that it was, "extremely biased, ideologically driven that I can’t see any academically legitimacy to".

References

1945 births
Living people
Republican Party Wyoming state senators
Republican Party members of the Wyoming House of Representatives
Politicians from Casper, Wyoming
Harvard Business School alumni
People from Klamath County, Oregon
21st-century American politicians